Charles Mackenzie Bruff (15 January 1887 – 17 October 1955) was a Norwegian chemist.

He was born in Christiania (now Oslo), Norway. He was educated at Chalmers University of Technology in Gothenburg. He was a teacher in chemistry at Oslo Handelsgymnasium from 1915 to 1947. He was a specialist in forensic chemistry, officially authorized as a forensic chemist in 1921 by the Ministry of Justice and Public Security. He contributed to about 15,000 crime cases during his career. He published his autobiography De tause vitner  (1949).

Selected works

References 

1887 births
1955 deaths
Scientists from Oslo
Chalmers University of Technology alumni
Schoolteachers from Oslo
Norwegian chemists
Norwegian memoirists
Forensic scientists
20th-century Norwegian educators
20th-century memoirists